Eddie Smith (17 September 1926 – 4 July 1997) was an Australian racing cyclist. He won the Australian national road race title in 1954 and 1955.  Smith finished second in 1956 behind Russell Mockridge.

In 1954 he won the Goulburn to Sydney Classic, in reverse direction from Enfield to Goulburn  In the Melbourne to Warrnambool Classic Smith set the fastest time in 1954 and the third fastest time in 1949.

References

External links

1926 births
1997 deaths
Australian male cyclists
Sportspeople from Canberra
Cyclists from the Australian Capital Territory